The following is a list of squads for each nation competing in football at the 1930 Central American and Caribbean Games in Havana.

Costa Rica
Head coach:  Manolo Rodríguez

Cuba
Head coach:  Antonio Orobio

El Salvador
Head coach:  Mark Scott Thompson

Guatemala
Head coach:  Roberto Figueredo

Honduras
Head coach:

Jamaica
Head coach:

References

External links
 

1930 Central American and Caribbean Games
1930
1930